Maksym Volodymyrovych Kopeychykov (Ukrainian: Володимир Володимирович Копєйчиков; January 4, 1977 – May 8, 2016) was a Ukrainian attorney.

Biography
In 1999 he graduated from Taras Shevchenko National University of Kyiv, Ukraine, Law Department and received a Master of Laws degree with honors.

He started his professional career in 1997. From 2001 till 2016 Kopeychykov was a Partner of Ilyashev & Partners Law Firm where he headed the practice of banking and financial law. Maksym V. Kopeychykov was widely known as one of the prominent specialists in Ukraine in the spheres of banking law, agribusiness, taxation and real estate. He authored over 100 publications published in the leading legal and business printed media and often participated as a keynote speaker at many big-scale conferences aimed at improvement of Ukrainian legislation.

He was admitted to bar in 2003 by the Kyiv Region Bar Association.

He was actively involved in public activities: ran the Civil Law Committee of the Public Council at the Ministry of Justice of Ukraine where he worked (from 2013) over the improvement of legal framework related to the matters of the state registration of the rights to immovable property. In the course of a number of years he took part in the drafting of Doing Business – international publication produced by the World Bank and the International Finance Corporation.

He participated in the Working Group of the National Bank of Ukraine and of the World Bank engaged into the elaboration of the Draft Law “On Financial Obligations Restructuring”.

On April 23, 2015 Maksym V. Kopeychykov was elected to the post of the Head of the Supervisory Board of Joint Stock Company “Oranta” at the annual General Meeting of the company’s shareholders. Earlier (in February 2015) he had temporarily performed obligations of the Head of the Supervisory Board.

He died on May 8, 2016; he was buried at Baikove Cemetery in Kyiv.

Private life 
Kopeychykov had a wife, two daughters and a son.

In the News
Media outlets including Bloomberg, Forbes, Liga, 112 Ukraine regularly cite Kopeychykov as an expert.

Recognitions 
 2016 – Best Lawyers International (real estate practice)
 2016 – Chambers Europe (taxation) 
 2016 – The Legal 500 – EMEA (banking and financial law, real estate and construction, taxation)
 2016 – Ukrainian Law Firms. A Handbook for Foreign Clients (taxation)
 2015 – «Client choice: TOP 100 lawyers of Ukraine»
 2015 – Tax Directors Handbook (taxation)
 2015 – Chambers Europe (taxation) 
 2015 – The Legal 500 – EMEA (banking and financial law, real estate and construction, taxation)
 2015 – Ukrainian Law Firms. A Handbook for Foreign Clients (taxation)

Commemoration 
In 2016 within the annual ceremony “Legal Awards”, organized by Yurydychna Praktyka Publishing House, a special award was established – “Maksym Kopeychykov Legal Award”. It will be annually awarded to the best law firm in the sphere of taxation.

References

External links 
 Profile at Bloomberg
 24.02.2016 II Legal Banking Forum: Максим Копейчиков
 Ilyashev’s Maksym Kopeychykov joins working group on administrative reform
 Maksym Kopeychykov, Partner at Ilyashev and Partners, dies at 39
 Maksym Kopeychykov Prize Established by Yurydychna Praktyka
 Maksym V. Kopeychykov (in memoriam 1977 – 2016)

1977 births
2016 deaths
Lawyers from Kyiv

Kopeychykov Volodymyr Volodymyrovych